Bugis Street (妖街皇后) is a 1995 Hong Kong-Singapore co-production directed by Yonfan, about the lives of Singaporean transvestites in a bygone era. It was a minor hit at the box office with a sexually-explicit R(A) (Restricted (Artistic) rating, male full-frontal nudity and its nostalgic evocation of a seedy but colourful aspect of Singaporean culture, prior to the redevelopment of Bugis Street into a modern shopping district and the eradication of transvestite activities in the area.

In 2015, the restored version of the film was presented at the 26th Singapore International Film Festival as Bugis Street Redux.

Synopsis
Sixteen-year-old Lien, portrayed by Vietnamese actress Hiep Thi Le, is the main protagonist. Despite having worked for a time as a servant in a household whose "young master" adored her in her hometown of Malacca in West Malaysia, the young girl comes across as having led a surprisingly sheltered life. She journeys to Singapore to seek employment as a maid in the Sin Sin Hotel along Bugis Street.

She seems thoroughly content for a time to possess a naïve, romanticised view of the rambunctious goings-on at the hotel where she witnesses "the sad departure of an American gentleman" from the home-cum-workplace of "his Chinese girl". The guest is actually a presently-sober but angry American sailor who has belatedly discovered that the Singaporean Chinese prostitute he picked up in Bugis Street and spent a drunken night with happens to be a trans woman. Before long, the new employee Lien finds out that many of the long-term lodgers of the budget establishment, whose room rental rate is S$3, whether it be for an hour or the entire day and night, are trans women.

Although her first reaction to seeing someone with breasts and a penis is one of revulsion which causes her to contemplate fleeing the neighbourhood, she instead listens to and heeds the cajoling and advice of Lola, the trans hotel resident who has treated her well from the start of her stint. She comes to accept the unique, complex personalities of the unorthodox community, who in turn also begin to accept her. As she learns to look beyond the surface, she is rewarded with the generous friendship of the cosmopolitan and sophisticated Drago, who has returned from Paris to minister to his/her dying but loving and tolerant mother.

While Lien learns the ways of the world via her encounters with Meng, the slimy, often underdressed boyfriend of Lola, as well as night-time escapades on the town with the Sin Sin Hotel's other denizens, she begins to see beauty in unlikely places and to grow despite the presence of ugliness in an imperfect world.

Cast
Hiep Thi Le as Lien
Michael Lam as Meng
Greg-O as Drago
Ernest Seah as Lola
David Knight as Sailor
Maggie Lye as Maggie
Gerald Chen as Mrs. Hwee
Mavia as Zsa Zsa
Sofia as Sophie
Linden as Linda
Lily Siew Lin Ong as Drago's Mother (as Lily Ong)
Matthew Foo as Dr. Toh
Benedict Goh as Sing (Schoolboy)
Gerald Chen as Mrs. Hwee
Matthew Foo as Dr. Toh
Godfrey Yew as Mr. Wong
Charles as Wah Chai
Kelvin Lua as Drago's Boyfriend
Tyosaurus Club as Male Joggers
Sharon Chua as Sister One
Jimmy Newton-Lim as Sister Two
Anthony Yeo as Sister From Bangkok
Anuar as Sister From Africa
Sim Wen Chiat, How as 少爷 (Young master)

See also
 List of lesbian, gay, bisexual or transgender-related films (sorted alphabetically)
 List of lesbian, gay, bisexual, or transgender-related films by storyline
 Nudity in film (East Asian cinema since 1929)

References

External links
 Internet Movie Database (IMDB)
 New York Times Review
  Popspoken Review | Discussion with cast and director

1995 films
Chinese LGBT-related films
Hong Kong independent films
1995 drama films
1995 LGBT-related films
Films set in Singapore
Gay-related films
LGBT-related drama films
Hong Kong LGBT-related films
Singaporean independent films
Singaporean LGBT-related films
1990s English-language films
1990s Mandarin-language films
Films directed by Yonfan
Hong Kong drama films
Singaporean drama films
Films about trans women
1995 independent films
1990s Hong Kong films